Parliamentary elections were held in Armenia on 5 July 1995, with a second round on 29 July. There were 150 constituency seats and 40 elected on a national basis using proportional representation. The result was a victory for the Republic Bloc (an alliance of the Pan-Armenian National Movement, Democratic Liberal Party, Christian Democratic Union and the Republican Party of Armenia), which won 88 of the 190 seats. Overall voter turnout was 54.3%. Following the election, the Republic Bloc and the Shamiram party formed a coalition government.

Results

References

Armenia
1995 in Armenia
Parliamentary elections in Armenia
1990s in Armenian politics
Election and referendum articles with incomplete results